Jacob Hunter Sharp (February 6, 1833 – September 15, 1907) was a Mississippi lawyer, newspaperman and politician, as well as a general in the Confederate States Army during the American Civil War. He played a prominent role of several major engagements of the Army of Tennessee in the Western Theater, including the Atlanta Campaign in 1864 where he was several times recognized by his commanders and peers for bravery in combat. After the war, he also served in the Mississippi House of Representatives and was its Speaker from 1886 to 1888.

Early life and career
Jacob Sharp was born in Pickensville, Alabama, to Elisha Hunter Sharp and his wife, Sallie (Carter) Hunt, who originally hailed from Hertford County, North Carolina. His mother was the daughter of former military officer Major Isaac Carter. His brother Thomas L. Sharp would become an antebellum Mississippi State Senator and a colonel in the Confederate Army during the Civil War. He would be killed in action at the Battle of Atlanta in 1864.

As a young child, Sharp moved with this family to Lowndes County, Mississippi. At the age of fifteen, he returned to Pickens County, Alabama, in 1850 and later graduated from the University of Alabama. While attending The University of Alabama, he joined the Alpha Delta Phi fraternity. He subsequently returned to Columbus, Mississippi after graduation, and became an attorney. He married Miss Harris of Mississippi, a daughter of Judge Harris.

Civil War service
At the start of the Civil War, Sharp enlisted in the 1st Mississippi Battalion, which was later consolidated into the 44th Mississippi Infantry (also known as Blythe's Regiment). He rose through the ranks from private to captain and participated in the Battle of Shiloh, Bragg's Kentucky Campaign, and the Battle of Murfreesboro. Promoted to colonel in August 1863, he led a brigade following the promotion of Brig. Gen. Patton Anderson and was in command of it at Chickamauga and the Battle of Missionary Ridge.

During the 1864 Atlanta Campaign, General Anderson wrote in his official report on the Battle of Jonesboro, "Sharp's gallant Mississippians could be seen pushing their way in small parties up to the very slope of the enemy’s breastworks. Officers could be plainly observed encouraging the men to this work. One on horseback, whom I took to be General Sharp, was particularly conspicuous."

Sharp became a brigadier general on July 24, 1864, following the wounding of Brig. Gen. William F. Tucker at the Battle of Resaca and given command of the Fifth Brigade in Edward Johnson's division of Stephen D. Lee's corps of the Army of Tennessee.

He participated in the Franklin-Nashville Campaign later that year. In the assault during the Battle of Franklin on November 30, 1864, Johnson's Division charged the works after dark and Sharp's Brigade was distinguished in the desperate struggle, taking three Union battle flags and leaving their dead and wounded in the trenches and along the works. Sharp himself was wounded in the battle, but soon recovered. Following the Battle of Nashville in December, the defeated Army of Tennessee recrossed the Tennessee River on December 26. Sharp's Brigade was then furloughed until February 12, 1865, when they were reactivated. In April 1865, he and his men surrendered at Bennett Place following the Carolinas Campaign.

Postbellum activities
After the war ended later that year, Sharp returned home and resumed his legal career. During the Reconstruction period, he was involved in white supremacy efforts and led the Lowndes County chapter of the Ku Klux Klan. He also became a newspaper editor, becoming the owner of the Columbus Independent in 1879. In 1885, he was elected to represent Lowndes County in the Mississippi House of Representatives for the 1886-1888 term. He was re-elected in 1887 for the 1888-1890 term, and again in 1889 for the 1890-1892 term. During the 1886-1888 term, he served as the House's Speaker. He served again in the House in the 1900-1904 term.

Sharp died in Columbus, Mississippi, and is buried there in Friendship Cemetery.

See also

List of American Civil War generals (Confederate)

Notes

References
 Eicher, John H., and David J. Eicher, Civil War High Commands. Stanford: Stanford University Press, 2001. .
 44th Mississippi website Retrieved 2008-09-18
 Sifakis, Stewart. Who Was Who in the Civil War. New York: Facts On File, 1988. .
 Warner, Ezra J. Generals in Gray: Lives of the Confederate Commanders. Baton Rouge: Louisiana State University Press, 1959. .3.
 B. B. Winborne's History of Hertford County North Carolina; Family genealogy Retrieved 2008-09-18

External links
  Retrieved 2008-09-18
 Sharp's official report for the Battle of Atlanta

1833 births
1907 deaths
Confederate States Army generals
People of Mississippi in the American Civil War
People from Pickensville, Alabama
People from Lowndes County, Mississippi
University of Alabama alumni
Mississippi lawyers
Members of the Mississippi House of Representatives
Speakers of the Mississippi House of Representatives
American Ku Klux Klan members
19th-century American politicians